WAYL (91.9 MHz) is an FM radio station licensed to St. Augustine, Florida.  The station is currently owned by Delmarva Educational Association and airs a Christian talk and teaching radio format using the moniker "The Truth."  It is simulcast on 91.7 WTRJ-FM in Orange Park, Florida and 91.3 WATY in Folkston, Georgia.  WTRJ covers the City of Jacksonville and its adjacent communities, while WAYL covers the southern part of the Jacksonville metropolitan area and WATY covers the northern section. Programming is also broadcast on WAYL's two translator stations in Jacksonville (94.3 MHz) and Atlantic Beach, Florida (103.7 MHz).

The Truth carries a schedule of national religious leaders, including David Jeremiah, Charles Stanley, John MacArthur, Jim Daly and Chuck Swindoll.  Hosts may seek donations during their programs.  Some programming is supplied by the Salem Radio Network.

History of WAYL Call Sign

The WAYL call sign has been used by other broadcasters in the past, including 93.7 FM (now KXXR) in Minneapolis-St. Paul, Minnesota, which programmed a beautiful music format popular in the 1960s and 70s. It often referred to itself as "The Beautiful WAYL," pronouncing the call letters as "whale."  In 1961 Jack I. Moore built and managed WAYL FM, and produced the first FM stereo broadcast between Chicago and the West Coast, working under great pressure to get on the air in time for a major exhibition on November 16, 1961.

Translators

References

External links

Contemporary Christian radio stations in the United States
AYL